Daniel Owefin Amokachi  (born 30 December 1972) is a Nigerian football manager and former professional player.

As a player he was a forward who notably played in the Premier League for Everton and was part of their 1995 FA Cup winning team, he also played top flight football in both Belgium and Turkey with extended spells at Club Brugge and Beşiktaş. Whilst with Brugge in 1992 he scored the club's first goal in the UEFA Champions League. He also had a brief spells with Ranchers Bees, Colorado Rapids and Nasarawa United. He was capped 44 times by Nigeria, scoring 13 goals. His spell in international football saw him win the African Cup of Nations in 1994 and a gold medal at the 1996 Olympics. He was also present in his nations squads for 1994 FIFA World Cup and 1998 FIFA World Cup.

Upon retiring, Amokachi moved into coaching and has spent time as manager of Nasarawa United, Enyimba, Ifeanyi Ubah and JS Hercules. He has also spent two spells as assistant coach of Nigeria, as well as managing his nation in an interim basis from 2014 to 2015.

Club career
Amokachi, nicknamed "The Bull", was discovered while playing for Ranchers Bees by Nigerian national team coach Clemens Westerhof, who brought the talented player to the 1990 African Nations Cup, and soon Amokachi moved to play for Club Brugge in Belgium. He competed in the new format of the Champions League, and became the first player to score in the competition, after his goal secured a 1–0 win in the opening match in the group stage against CSKA Moscow. Performing well in Belgium and at the 1994 World Cup, Everton became interested in Amokachi and their manager Mike Walker signed him for a fee of £3 million ($4.7 million).

He went on to win the FA Cup with Everton in 1995, scoring two goals in the semi-final against Tottenham Hotspur after 'substituting himself' into the match while Paul Rideout was receiving treatment (the manager Joe Royle had only instructed him to warm up in preparation for possibly coming on). He appeared in the final only briefly, late on, again as a substitute but is remembered fondly for his beret-wearing celebrations afterwards.

He remained at Everton until the end of the 1995–96 season, when he was transferred to Beşiktaş of Turkey for a fee of £1.75 million. He had failed to make the impact at Goodison Park that many fans had been hoping for, and had been unable to win a regular place in the first team, as Rideout and Duncan Ferguson were firmly established as Everton's two strikers at that stage. He did, however, stand in for Ferguson while he spent six weeks in prison during the autumn of 1995 for an offence committed in Scotland 18 months earlier.

After leaving Beşiktaş in 1999, his playing career more or less ended. He signed with 1860 Munich, but the contract was cancelled after he failed a medical test. In turn he was rejected by Tranmere Rovers for the same reason. Amokachi trained with French second division side US Créteil, but the deal was hampered by injuries. American MLS team Colorado Rapids signed him in 2002, but seeing he was not fit enough they released him before a single match was played. He went to play in the United Arab Emirates, but was denied again due to his medical condition.

International career

He played many international matches for Nigeria, and was part of the team that participated in the 1994 FIFA World Cup and 1998 FIFA World Cup and won the 1994 African Nations Cup. He also helped win the Olympic gold medal in 1996, scoring in the gold medal game itself against Argentina.

Amokachi sustained an injury just ahead of the 1998 FIFA World Cup, played one match at the tournament, but struggled with knee problems thereafter.

Managerial career
Amokachi managed Nigerian club Nasarawa United and later Enyimba Aba. In April 2007, he quit his role as assistant coach of the Nigeria national team. On 10 April 2008, Amokachi was re-appointed to Nigeria's national team, the Super Eagles, as assistant coach to Shuaibu Amodu, and then as assistant to Stephen Keshi.

In 2015, Amokachi managed Ifeanyi Ubah, resigning after five weeks in the post. In January 2016, he was named as manager of JS Hercules. 4 February 2020, Amokachi was named as Nigeria’s football ambassador by the President, Major General Muhammadu Buhari (retd).

Personal life
Amokachi is married to a Tunisian woman and has twin sons named Kalim and Nazim, both of whom are currently in the Besiktas youth academy. He also has a daughter named Raya.

Career statistics

Club

International

Scores and results list Nigeria's goal tally first, score column indicates score after each Amokachi goal.

Honours
Everton
FA Cup: 1994–95
FA Charity Shield: 1995

Beşiktaş
Turkish Cup: 
Turkish Super Cup: 1998

Nigeria
African Cup of Nations: 1994
Olympic Games: Gold Medal 1996

Individual
 Beşiktaş's Super League 2000th goal.
 International Honorary Award of Sportsmen of Turkey: 2015
 African Footballer of the Year Third: 1994 (France Football), 1995, 1996
 UEFA Champions League First Goal: 1992
 Belgian Ebony Shoes Award: 1992,1994
 IFFHS 20th-century best player in Africa: 18th place
 West African Club Championship 'The best young footballer' award: 1989
 Pro League 'Most successful foreign player' award: 1992
Beşiktaş J.K. Squads of Century (Bronze Team)

References

External links

 
 Daniel Amokachi BJK Profile
 Amokachi's BJK History
 RSSSF Profile
 
 Eurosport Profile
 Premier Lig Profile
 Everton FC Profile
 Nigeria Profile

1972 births
Living people
Association football forwards
Nigerian footballers
Nigerian expatriate footballers
Club Brugge KV players
Everton F.C. players
Beşiktaş J.K. footballers
Süper Lig players
Premier League players
Belgian Pro League players
Expatriate footballers in Turkey
Expatriate footballers in Belgium
Expatriate footballers in England
Nigeria international footballers
Olympic footballers of Nigeria
Olympic gold medalists for Nigeria
Footballers at the 1996 Summer Olympics
1994 FIFA World Cup players
1995 King Fahd Cup players
Nigerian expatriate sportspeople in Turkey
1998 FIFA World Cup players
1990 African Cup of Nations players
Nasarawa United F.C. players
Enyimba F.C. managers
Africa Cup of Nations-winning players
1994 African Cup of Nations players
Olympic medalists in football
Nigerian expatriate sportspeople in the United States
Medalists at the 1996 Summer Olympics
Nigerian football managers
FA Cup Final players
JS Hercules managers
Sportspeople from Kaduna
Nigeria Football Federation